The 1953 New Year Honours in New Zealand were appointments by Queen Elizabeth II on the advice of the New Zealand government to various orders and honours to reward and highlight good works by New Zealanders. The awards celebrated the passing of 1952 and the beginning of 1953, and were announced on 1 January 1953.

The recipients of honours are displayed here as they were styled before their new honour.

Order of Saint Michael and Saint George

Knight Commander (KCMG)
 His Excellency Frederick Widdowson Doidge – high commissioner in London for New Zealand.

Companion (CMG)
 Henry Ralph Hervey Chalmers – of Wadestown. For services to banking and sport.
 John Hector Luxford – principal stipendiary magistrate in Auckland.

Order of the British Empire

Dame Grand Cross (GBE)
Civil division
 The Right Honourable Barbara, Baroness Freyberg . In recognition of her services to New Zealand.

Commander (CBE)
Civil division
 Philip Norton Cryer – director-general of the Post and Telegraph Department.
 Jane Robertson McKenzie – New Zealand chargé d'affaires in Paris.
 Geoffrey Sylvester Peren – principal of the Massey Agricultural College. For services to agriculture.
 William Henry Price – of Wellington. For services to shipping and local government.

Officer (OBE)
Civil division
 Harold Galt Dickie – of Rotorua. For public and local government services.
 Frederick James Earle – of Nelson. For services to journalism.
 Joseph William Hadfield – of Christchurch. For services to agriculture, and especially in connection with the development of the linen flax industry.
 Arthur Kidd  – a medical practitioner at Waipiata Sanatorium.
 Herbert Seton Stewart Kyle – of Riccarton. For public and local government services.
 Albert Edward Lawrence – of Timaru. For services to the community, especially in the fields of sport, journalism and education.
 Tohuroa Hira Parata – of Wellington. For services to the Māori people, especially in the field of athletics.
 Stanley Rice – of Southland. For services to education and local government.
 Thomas Leonard Seddon – of Feilding. For services to the community.
 William Burgoyne Taverner – of Dunedin. For services to the community.
 Harold Temple White – of Wellington. For services to the community as a musician, especially in the training of school choirs.

Military division
 Commander Ralph Eric Harding  – Royal New Zealand Navy.
 Lieutenant-Colonel Edwjn Ernest Richards  – New Zealand Territorial Force.
 Wing Commander John William Henry Bray – Royal New Zealand Air Force.

Member (MBE)
Civil division
 William Prentice Black – engineer of the Waimate County Council.
 Olive Mary Brown – of Invercargill. For patriotic and social welfare services.
 Rose Cadness – of Auckland. For services, to the community, especially in connection with social welfare and local government.
 Ivy Marion Cuthbert – of Auckland. For patriotic and social welfare services.
 Ethel Maude Field – of Palmerston North. For services to the community especially in connection with women's organisations.
 Elizabeth May Gillespie – district nurse at Ōpōtiki.
 Helen Dorothy Grant – formerly matron of Masterton Public Hospital.
 Charles Adolph Kitto – of Wellington. For services to sport.
 Irene Florence Land – honorary secretary–treasurer of the New Zealand War Amputees' Association.
 Lydia Rachel Livingstone – of Christchurch. For social welfare services, especially in the interests of servicemen.
 Vida Alice Milroy – of New Plymouth; a district nurse and nurse inspector for many years.
 The Reverend Albert Everil Orr – a Methodist city missioner in Auckland.
 Florence Amelia Pritchard – a voluntary aid at the Mowai Red Cross Hospital for many years.
 Caroline Ada Seville – of Morrinsville. For patriotic and social welfare services.
 Takurua Tamarau – a leading chief of the Bay of Plenty. For services to the Māori people.
 Yvette Winifred Williams – of Dunedin. For services in women's athletics.

Military division
 Lieutenant-Commander Ian Barclay Campbell  – Royal New Zealand Naval Volunteer Reserve.
 Warrant Officer Second Class Leonard Arthur Hobbs – New Zealand Territorial Force.
 Captain (temporary Major) Edward George Taylor – New Zealand Regiment.
 Warrant Officer First Class (temporary) Edward James Trappitt – Royal New Zealand Electrical and Mechanical Engineers.
 Flight Lieutenant Raymond John Maltby Haggett – Air Training Corps, Royal New Zealand Air Force.
 Warrant Officer Ernest Wallace Bolton – Royal New Zealand Air Force.

British Empire Medal (BEM)
Civil division
 William George Mence – chauffeur, Public Service Garage, Wellington.
 Thomas Elliott Reid – station officer, New Zealand Fire Service, Wellington.

Military division
 Master-at-Arms Keith Frederick Connew – Royal New Zealand Navy.
 Temporary Chief Petty Officer Telegraphist Eric Andrew Sorenson – Royal New Zealand Navy.
 Staff-Sergeant (temporary Warrant Officer First Class) William Raymond Sutherland – Royal New Zealand Engineers.
 Flight Sergeant Harold Budd Dalton – Royal New Zealand Air Force.

Air Force Cross (AFC)
 Squadron Leader Sidney Maxwell Hope  –  Royal New Zealand Air Force.

References

New Year Honours
1953 awards
1953 in New Zealand
New Zealand awards